This is a list of University of New South Wales alumni.

Academia

Toby Walsh, computer scientist and artificial intelligence expert 
Dijana Alić, architect and academic
Michael Barber, mathematician, physicist and Vice-Chancellor of Flinders University from 2008 until 2014 (Mathematics)
 Gernot Heiser, John Lions chair and computer scientist 
Sharon Beder, arts academic (Engineering)
Glyn Davis , current Vice-Chancellor of University of Melbourne (Political science)
John Deeble, Architect of Medicare Australia
Rosalyn Diprose, philosopher and UNSW academic (Philosophy)
Ross Fitzgerald , academic, historian, novelist, secularist, and political commentator (PhD Politics)
Michael Fullilove, public and international policy academic, executive director of the Lowy Institute for International Policy (Arts/Law)
David Gonski , prominent businessman, Chancellor of UNSW Sydney (Commerce/LLB)
Atiqul Islam, accountant and current Vice-chancellor of North South University, Bangladesh (Commerce)
Koo Tsai Kee, Singaporean academic and former politician (Surveying)
Chandran Kukathas, Malaysian-born Australian political theorist and academic (MA, Politics)
Jane Stapleton, academic and Master at Christ's College, Cambridge
Tony Vinson, Emeritus Professor, Education and Social Work

Business

Rodney Adler, former FAI Insurance chief executive
Cheryl Bart , lawyer, company director and mountain climber (Commerce/LLB 1986)
Mark Bouris, chairman of Yellow Brick Road and television personality
Mike Cannon-Brookes, entrepreneur, billionaire, and co-CEO of the software company Atlassian (Information Science)
Paul Clitheroe , television presenter and businessman (Arts)
Matt Comyn, CEO of Commonwealth Bank
Roger Corbett , former chairman of the Reserve Bank of Australia, and a former CEO of Woolworths (Commerce)
Douglas Daft , prominent Australian and US business executive who served as CEO of The Coca-Cola Company between 1999 and 2004; now a global non-executive director (Dipl.Admin)
Satyajit Das, banker, author and academic (Law)
John De Margheriti, software developer and entrepreneur, founding father of Australia's video games industry (Electrical engineering)
Michael Easson , businessman and former union leader (Politics/History)
Richard Farleigh, private investor (Economics)
 Scott Farquhar, entrepreneur, billionaire, and co-CEO of the software company Atlassian (Arts/Science)
Angela Mak Soek Fun, Hong Kong-based business executive (Commerce/LLB)
David Gonski , prominent businessman, Chancellor of UNSW Sydney (Commerce/LLB)
John M. Green, deputy chairman of QBE Insurance; co-founder of Pantera Press; author
Catherine Harris  , co-founder and chairman of Harris Farm Markets and company director (Commerce) 
Philip Hercus, founder of International Catamaran Designs (Engineering)
Grant King, managing director, Origin Energy (Engineering)
David Lowy, non-executive deputy chairman of the Westfield Group
Steven Lowy, group managing director of the Westfield Group
Donald McDonald, former chairman of Australian Broadcasting Corporation (ABC)
Warwick McKibbin, Board of Directors of the Reserve Bank of Australia; economist
John Niland, director of Macquarie Group; Chairman of Centennial Park and Moore Park Trust; former Vice-Chancellor of UNSW Sydney
John Prescott, former CEO of BHP
Gregory G. Rose, principal engineer at Qualcomm (Engineering)
George Savvides, managing director, Medibank Private (Engineering)
Jillian Segal, non-executive director, National Australia Bank; Deputy Chancellor of UNSW Sydney (Law)
Gai Waterhouse, horse trainer and businesswoman

Community activism

Sharan Burrow, global union leader (Education)
Eva Cox , writer, feminist, sociologist, social commentator and activist (Sociology)
Louise Crossley, scientist and environmental activist (PhD)
Karen Dawn, American animal rights and welfare advocate and writer (Psychology)
Graeme Dunstan, cultural and political activist (Engineering)
Tim Flannery, mammalogist, palaeontologist, environmentalist and global warming activist; 2007 Australian of the Year (PhD Palaeontology)
Peter Garrett, musician, social activist, former politician (LLB 1977)
Heinz Harant, student activist and founder of the university's alumni association (Electrical engineering (Hons) 1955)
Betty Kitchener , Australian mental health educator and consumer advocate

Government

Prime Ministers
Scott Morrison, current Member for Cook and 30th Prime Minister of Australia

State Premiers
 Gladys Berejiklian, former Premier of New South Wales (Commerce)
 Bob Carr, former Premier of New South Wales, former Federal Minister for Foreign Affairs, former politician, author (Arts)
Stephen Hatton, former Chief Minister of the Northern Territory
 Campbell Newman, former Premier of Queensland, former politician

Federal politicians

Larry Anthony, former politician (Commerce)
Mark Arbib, former politician (Arts)
Vicki Bourne, former politician (Science)
Bob Carr, former Minister for Foreign Affairs, former Premier of New South Wales, former politician, author (Arts)
Alan Cadman, former politician (Agriculture)
Jason Clare, current Member for Blaxland, former Minister for Home Affairs and former Minister for Defence Materiel (Arts/Law)
David Coleman, current Member for Banks (Arts/Law)
Greg Combet, former politician and trade unionist (Engineering)
 Mehreen Faruqi, current Senator for New South Wales and former Member of the NSW Legislative Council (Environmental Engineering)
David Fawcett, current Senator for South Australia and former Army officer (Science)
Michael Forshaw, former politician (Law)
Jason Falinski, current Member for Mackellar (MBA)
Peter Garrett , musician, social activist, former politician (LLB 1977)
Michael Hatton former politician (Arts)
Andrew Hastie, current Member for Canning, retired Army officer
Mike Kelly , current Member for Eden-Monaro, retired Australian Army officer (PhD Law)
Craig Laundy, former Member for Reid (Economics)
Michael Lee, former politician (Electrical Engineering)
Julian Leeser, current Member for Berowra (LLB)
Sussan Ley, current Member for Farrer, former Minister for Health and Ageing
Ted Mack, former politician (Architecture)
Louise Markus, former politician (Arts)
Stephen Mutch, former politician (LLB)
Gary Nairn, former politician
Kerry Nettle, former politician
Andrew Nikolic, former politician and retired Army officer (Management)
Melissa Parke, former United Nations senior lawyer, former politician (Law)
Marise Payne, current Senator for New South Wales and Minister for Defence
Lee Rhiannon, former Senator for New South Wales and former Member of the NSW Legislative Council (Science)
Stuart Robert, current Member for Fadden, former Army officer (Arts)

Australian state and territory politicians

 Jack Beale, former politician (Engineering)
Stephen Bromhead, former Member for Myall Lakes (M.Law)
 Arthur Chesterfield-Evans, former Member of the NSW Legislative Council (Science)
 Ian Cohen, former Member of the NSW Legislative Council (Arts/DipEd)
 Kevin Conolly, current Member for Riverstone (Arts)
 Paul Crittenden former Member for Wyong (Commerce)
 Mehreen Faruqi, former Member of the NSW Legislative Council and current Senator for New South Wales (Environmental Engineering)
Luke Foley, former Member for Auburn and NSW Leader of the Opposition (Arts)
Bryce Gaudry, former politician and teacher (Arts)
 Alex Greenwich, current Member for Sydney (Arts)
Sylvia Hale, former Member of the NSW Legislative Council (LLB 1998)
 Brad Hazzard, current Member for Wakehurst (Law)  
Courtney Houssos, current Member of the NSW Legislative Council (Arts)
Andrew Humpherson, former Member for Davidson (Chemical Engineering)
Trevor Khan, current Member of the NSW Legislative Council (LLB/B.Juris.)
Sonya Kilkenny, current Member for Carrum in the Victorian Legislative Assembly (BA/LLB 1995)
 Ernie Page, former politician  
 Doug Parkinson, former politician in Tasmania
 Eleni Petinos, Member for Miranda (LLB 2011)
 Lee Rhiannon, former Member of the NSW Legislative Council and current Senator for New South Wales (Science)
 Eric Roozendaal, former Treasurer of New South Wales and former politician (Law)
 Penny Sharpe, current Member of the NSW Legislative Council (Food Technology)
 Gabrielle Upton, current Member for Vaucluse (Arts/Law)

International politicians

Jackie Chan, former member of the Legislative Council of Hong Kong (Engineering)
Andrew Cheng, Hong Kong politician, Councillor of Legislative Council of Hong Kong (Law)
Chua Tian Chang, Malaysian politician, current Member of Parliament for the Batu constituency (Philosophy)
Mehdi Ghazanfari, former Iranian politician
Meutya Hafid, Indonesian politician, member of People's Representative Council, former journalist
Foo Mee Har, Singaporean politician, Member of Parliament for the West Coast Group constituency (Science)
Koo Tsai Kee, former Singaporean politician and academic (Surveying)
Aiyaz Sayed-Khaiyum, Fijian politician and current Attorney General of Fiji (LLB)
Mah Bow Tan, Minister for National Development of Singapore
Jeremy Tam, Councillor of Legislative Council of Hong Kong, airline pilot (Engineering)

Australian local government politicians
Kathryn Greiner , former Alderman of the City of Sydney and social advocate (Social Work)
Lucy Turnbull, former Lord Mayor of Sydney (MBA)

Public servants

Michele Bruniges , current secretary of the Department of Education and Training (Education)
Elizabeth Broderick, former Australian Sex Discrimination Commissioner (Law)
Ian Campbell , former secretary of the Department of Veterans' Affairs (Economics) 
Jeff Harmer , former secretary of the Department of Families, Housing, Community Services and Indigenous Affairs (BA (Hons), DipEd, PhD)
Ken Henry  , economist and former secretary of The Treasury (Economics)
John Holloway, former diplomat and public servant (Arts)
Frank Howarth , former director of the Australian Museum (MSc Soc)
Robyn Kruk , former secretary of the Department of the Environment, Water, Heritage and the Arts and a director-general of the NSW Department of Premier and Cabinet (Science [Honours])
Patrick Lawless, Australian diplomat, current Ambassador to Brazil (LLB)
Damien Miller, Australian diplomat, current Ambassador to Denmark, Norway and Iceland (Arts/Law)
Anne-Marie Schwirtlich AM, Director-General of the National Library of Australia

Other public figures
Bruce Hawker, political pundit, political writer, political consultant, political advisor (LLB)
Janette Howard, spouse of the 25th Prime Minister of Australia, John Howard (Arts)

Humanities

Architecture
Philip Cox, architect and entrepreneur, founder of COX Architects (Science)
Richard Johnson , architect, best known as the ome of the Australian most important and iconic cultural buildings and spaces (Architecture, 1969)

Arts

Del Kathryn Barton, visual artist
Matt Carroll, Australian film and television producer
Queenie Chan, Chinese-Australian comic artist (Computer Programming)
Barbara Cleveland, Australian contemporary performance artist
Judith Clingan , composer, conductor, performer and music educator
Adam Cullen, visual artist (Fine Arts)
John Davis, documentary filmmaker, mountaineer, television producer, chemical engineer (Science)
Marta Dusseldorp, actor (Film/Theatre)
Anne Ferran, photographer (Fine Arts)
David Fung, concert pianist (MB BS)
Francis Giacco, visual artist (Architecture)
Shaun Gladwell, visual artist
Gordon Hanley, visual artist
Noel Hodda, actor, writer, dramaturge, director and teacher (Acting)
Frank Howarth, geologist, Director of the Australian Museum
Byron Kennedy, film producer
Amber Lawrence, singer, songwriter
Stephanie Lemelin, Canadian actress
Lenka, born Lenka Kripac, singer
Yaron Lifschitz, theatre director
George Miller, movie producer, television screenwriter, producer and director of Happy Feet
Gregory Charles Rivers, Hong Kong actor
Emile Sherman, Oscar winner, film producer (Arts/Law)
Glenn Sorensen, Australia-born, Sweden artist
Rebel Wilson, actress, writer, and producer (Arts/LLB 2009)

History
John Blaxland, Australian historian, academic, and former Australian Army officer (Arts)
Tim Cook , Canadian military historian and author (PhD)
Jeffrey Grey, former Australian military historian and academic (PhD Military history)
David Horner , Australian military historian and academic (M.Arts [Honours])

Journalism
Jordan Shanks, Political commentator
Bettina Arndt, sex therapist and journalist
Monica Attard , award-winning journalist and Australian Broadcasting Corporation host (LLB) 
Richard Carleton, television journalist (Commerce)
Allan Hogan, investigative journalist and television producer (Commerce)
Craig James, economic journalist and economist, currently chief economist with Commsec (Commerce/Economics)
Debbie Kruger, Australian music journalist and pop-culture writer (BA/MA)

Literature, writing and poetry

Jack Bedson, writer, children's author, poet and academic librarian
Larissa Behrendt, Aboriginal writer and academic (LLB/B.Juri 1992)
Alex Buzo, pioneer playwright
Melissa Chiu, museum director, curator writer
 Tim Cook, historian and author
Michael Dransfield, poet
Suzanne Falkiner, writer (Arts)
Susanne Gervay, author of young adult fiction (Education)
John M. Green, author and publisher
Anita Heiss, author, presenter and commentator (Arts/History)
Tristan Jepson, comedic writer (LLB)
Drusilla Modjeska, writer
Matthew Reilly, author (Law)
Pamela Stephenson, comedian/writer
Natalie Tran, producer, actress, comedian, writer
Rebel Wilson, actress, comedian and writer (Law)
Markus Zusak, writer

Philosophy
Khosrow Bagheri, Iranian philosopher
Rosalyn Diprose, Australian philosopher and academic (Philosophy)
Moira Gatens, Australian academic

Law

Judges and magistrates

Bob Bellear, Australia's first indigenous District Court judge (LLB 1978)
Annabelle Bennett , chancellor of Bond University and former Federal Court judge (LLB)
Chris Craigie , District Court judge and former Director of Public Prosecutions
Ros Croucher , lawyer and academic, incoming president of the Australian Human Rights Commission (PhD Legal history)
Karin Emerton, Victorian Supreme Court judge (LLB)
Anna Katzmann, current Federal Court judge (LLB)
Megan Latham, current Supreme Court of New South Wales judge (BA/LLB 1979)
Robert McClelland, Family Court judge and former Commonwealth Attorney-General (BA/LLB 1981)
Anthony Meagher, current judge of the Court of Appeal of the Supreme Court of New South Wales (Commerce/LLB)
Helen Murrell , Chief Justice of the Supreme Court of the Australian Capital Territory  
Matthew Myers , Federal Circuit Court Judge and Commissioner Australian Law Reform Commission
John Nicholas, Federal Court judge (BA/LLB)
Pat O'Shane , teacher, barrister, public servant, jurist, Aboriginal activist; Australia's first Aboriginal magistrate; former chancellor of the University of New England (LLB 1976)

Other legal professionals
Stuart Fuller, legal partner in the banking and finance team at law firm King & Wood Mallesons (Commerce/Law)
Stuart Littlemore , barrister, writer and original host of ABC's Media Watch (Law)
George Newhouse, human rights lawyer and a former local councillor (Commerce/Law)

Military

Peter Abigail, retired Australian Army officer, ranked major general
Tim Barrett , current Australian Chief of Navy, ranked vice admiral
Greg Bilton , current Australian Army officer serving as Deputy Chief of Joint Operations, ranked major general
Rick Burr , current Australian Army officer serving as Chief of Army, ranked lieutenant general
John Caligari , retired Australian Army officer, ranked lieutenant general (Arts/Defence Studies)
John Cantwell, retired Australian Army officer, ranked major general
Allan du Toit , retired Australian Navy officer, ranked real admiral (Defence/Strategic Studies)
Gus Gilmore , current Australian Army officer, serving as Head of Military Strategic Commitments Division, ranked major general (Arts)
James Goldrick , retired Australian Navy officer, ranked rear admiral (Arts)
Ian Gordon , retired Australian Army officer, ranked major general (Science/Military Studies, 1973)
John Harvey, retired Royal Australian Air Force officer, ranked air marshal (Architecture/Psychology/Information Science)
Andrew Hastie, current Member for Canning, retired Australian Army officer
Peter Jones , retired Australian Navy officer, ranked vice admiral (BA/MA)
Mark Kelly , retired Australian Army officer, ranked major general (BA/MA)
Mike Kelly , current Member for Eden-Monaro, retired Australian Army officer (PhD Law)
David Kilcullen, Australian author, strategist and global counterinsurgency expert; retired Australian Army officer, ranked lieutenant colonel (BA, PhD)
Andrew Nikolic, former politician and retired Australian Army officer (Management)
Stuart Robert, current Member for Fadden, former Australian Army officer (Arts)

Popular culture
 Amy Lyons – Internet personality in China
 Sam Chui – World's most popular Aviation Blogger based in United Arab Emirates
 Pranav Mohanlal – Malayalam film actor

Religious leaders
Peter Chiswell, Anglican bishop, formerly the Bishop of Armidale
Tom Frame, Anglican bishop, historian, academic, author and social commentator (Arts/PhD)
Peter Hayward, Anglican bishop, currently serving as the Bishop of Wollongong (Civil Engineering)
Brian King, former Anglican assistant bishop in the Diocese of Sydney (Theology)
Julian Leow Beng Kim, current Archbishop of the Roman Catholic Archdiocese of Kuala Lumpur (Building)

Sciences

Biology
Mark Burgman, ecologist (Science)
Jessie Christiansen, exoplanetologist
Bernard d'Abrera, entomological taxonomist and philosopher of science (Arts with majors in History/Science)
Jocelyn Dela-Cruz, eco-physiologist
Steve Donnellan, biologist and chief research scientist of the Evolutionary Biology Unit at the South Australian Museum (Science)
Tim Flannery, mammalogist, palaeontologist, environmentalist and global warming activist; 2007 Australian of the Year (PhD Palaeontology)
Levon Khachigian, vascular cell and molecular biologist and academic (B.Science (Honours), PhD, D.Science)
Zinnia Kumar, evolutionary biologist, ecologist and fashion model (B. Advanced Science [Honours])
Alan O. Trounson, biologist

Chemistry
Rose Amal, chemical engineer
Gordon Aylward, chemist and author
Naiyyum Choudhury, Bangladeshi biochemist, founding Chairman of Bangladesh Atomic Energy Regulatory Authority (BAERA) (Biotechnology)

Computer scientists
Clive Finkelstein, computer scientist, known as the "father" of information technology engineering (Science) 
Carsten Haitzler, computer scientist, creator of Enlightenment
 Gernot Heiser, operating systems and ACM Fellow
Adam Kennedy, computer scientist
Sitthichai Pookaiyaudom, first Thai elected to IEEE Fellow; current President of Mahanakorn University of Technology; Thailand's Minister of Information and Communication Technologies
Claude Sammut, computer scientist
Raj Reddy, computer scientist, Turing Award

Engineering
Julie Cairney, Professor of Materials Science and Director of the Australian Centre for Microscopy and Microanalysis
Michael Collins, Canadian structural engineer (PhD)
Saeid Eslamian, Iranian hydrologist (Engineering)
Ron Fitch, railway executive and railway engineer (PhD)
Graham Goodwin, Australian electrical engineer and academic (Science, 1964; PhD, 1970)
Saul Griffith, Australian American inventor and material science mechanical engineer (Mechanical Engineering, 1997)
Sam Michael, sporting director of McLaren (Engineering)
Stuart Wenham, Director of ARC Photovoltaics Centre of Excellence, UNSW Australia (Engineering)

Mathematics and economics
Michael Barber, mathematician, physicist and Vice-Chancellor of Flinders University from 2008 until 2014 (Mathematics)
Lynne Billard, statistician and US academic (Science)
Lawrie Brown, cryptographer and computer security researcher (Mathematics)
Stephen Duckett, health economist (Health Administration/PhD)

Medicine
Samy Azer, international medical educator (Medicine)
Julie Campbell, vascular biologist
David A. Cooper, HIV/AIDS researcher and immunologist
Sir Richard Feachem , global public health administrator and anti-malaria activist (PhD in Environmental Health)
Peter Fricker , sports physician and administrator (MB BS)
Michelle Haber , paediatric cancer researcher (Psychology, PhD [Pathology])
Louise Maple-Brown , endocrinologist and clinical researcher
Steven Krilis, immunologist
Charlie Teo, neurosurgeon

Other medical sciences
John Ball, cognitive scientist
Julie Campbell, vascular biologist and current Director of the Centre for Research in Vascular Biology at the University of Queensland (Physiology)
David Cooper , Australian HIV/AIDS researcher, immunologist, professor at the University of New South Wales, and the director of the Kirby Institute (Medicine)
Gordon Parker, psychiatrist

Physics
Joan Adler, computational physicist
Murray Batchelor, mathematical physicist
Karl Kruszelnicki, physicist, medical practitioner, and science communicator (Biomedical Engineering)
John Pyke, physicist and retired law lecturer (LLB)

Service sector
Huen Su Yin, Malaysian blogger and cake designer (Construction Management)

Sport

 Sally Bennett, sabre fencer
 Matt Carroll , sports administrator and current chief executive of the Australian Olympic Committee (Construction)
 Todd Greenberg, sports administrator and current chief executive of the National Rugby League (Sports Science)
 Andrew Jones, sports administrator and current chief executive of Cricket NSW (BA/LLB)
 Phil Kearns , former rugby union international; former Wallabies captain (Arts)
 Tadhg Kennelly, former Australian rules football who played for the Sydney Swans
 Usman Khawaja, Pakistani-born Australian cricketer (Aviation)
 Geoff Lawson, cricketer
 Ewen McKenzie, current coach of the Queensland Reds
 Simon Poidevin, former Wallabies captain
 Marshall Rosen, cricketer
 Jane Saville, 2004 Summer Olympics medallist
 Michael Slater, cricketer
 Mark Taylor, cricketer (Australia's 39th test captain), Australian of the Year 1999
 Richard Walsh, professional mixed martial artist
 Michael Wenden, swimming champion, 1968 Summer Olympics gold medallist (two gold, one silver, one bronze)

See also

References

Further reading

New South Wales
University of New South Wales
 
University